Mirko Guerrini (born 28 April 1973) is an Italian-Australian jazz saxophonist, composer and arranger.

Biography
Mirko Guerrini was born in Florence, Italy. Has studied piano, saxophone, classical composition and jazz music at the Conservatorio “Cherubini” in Florence, as well as Jazz saxophone with Dave Liebman in New York.

Eclectic and multi-instrumentalist, composer and orchestra conductor, he has 20 Cds to his credit as a solo sax player and leader of jazz ensembles, more than 50 CDs as a sideman. He is now leading the band ‘Mirko Guerrini Horizontal Quartet’ (Andrea Keller, Tamara Murphy and Niko Schauble) and he is also the co-leader of the acclaimed band ‘Torrio!’ with Paul Grabowsky and Niko Schauble.

Guerrini has released 6 books: 2 with a selection of his compositions by the well known label Carisch Ed, and 3 educational books dedicated to the Jazz Tenor Saxophone: Stan Getz, Joe Henderson and Oliver Nelson.

He was part of the “blockbuster” project “Carioca” with Stefano Bollani (CD and DVD released with more than 80.000 copies sold), and has toured 3 times in Italy with more than 50 concerts. In two of them the great Caetano Veloso has joined the band.

Guerrini hosted the radio show “Dottor Djembè” together with the comedian David Riondino and the jazz superstar Stefano Bollani. The radio program was aired on the Italian national radio channel Radio3. The program won several awards for the best radio show, and went on for 6 years with more than 180 shows produced.

He has very high quality and varied collaborations: with Billy Cobham, Brian Auger, Mark Feldman, Stefano Bollani, Enrico Rava, Stefano Battaglia, Paul McCandless, Caetano Veloso, Hermeto Pascoal, Paul Grabowsky, Tony Gould, Niko Schauble, Andrea Keller, Monash Art Ensemble, as far as jazz is concerned, with notable singers-songwriters such as Ivano Fossati and Giorgio Gaber and with a number of other outstanding artists in Italy and abroad.

He is also in great demand as a composer/conductor with different Symphony Orchestras (Orchestra “A.Toscanini” of Parma, Orchestra Regionale Toscana, Orchestra della Campania and others), being the winner of International Music Competitions such as the “Concorso 2 Agosto di Bologna” (2000, 2005).

In Australia, Guerrini composed the music commissioned by the Melbourne Museum for their Aztecs Exhibition, producing all the music for both TV ads and live performances.

In 2019, Guerrini composed and produced the soundtrack for the stop motion VR movie ‘The Passenger’ who was finalist at the Mostra Internazionale del cinema di Venezia.

He has performed all over the world: in Brasil, Japan, Australia, Canada, Usa, France, Spain, Russia, Finland, Indonesia and in many other countries.

As an educator, Guerrini was a professor of Jazz Saxophone and Small Jazz Ensemble at the Conservatorio “Mascagni” in Livorno.

Since he permanently moved to Australia in 2013 he started teaching in Melbourne. Guerrini is now Adjunct Fellow and Teaching Associate at Monash University, and a teacher in several different Colleges.

Has been invited as visiting professor at UTAS in Hobart in Australia as well as at the Banff Centre for Performing Arts in Canada (2010, 2012), and has been the Keynote speaker at a Conference on “Musical Perspectives” at the Warwick University, in Warwick, England in 2012.

Together with Niko Schäuble he also started the educational project expEARience, based on the importance of listening and the auditory process.

Discography

As a leader

Awards

Music Victoria Awards
The Music Victoria Awards are an annual awards night celebrating Victorian music. They commenced in 2006.

! 
|-
| Music Victoria Awards of 2017
| Torrio! (With Paul Grabowsky & Niko Schäuble)
| Best Jazz Album
| 
| 
|-

References 

1973 births
Living people
Italian jazz musicians
Australian jazz composers
Australian people of Italian descent